Mueang Khong or Ban Mueang Khong is a tambon (sub-district) of Chiang Dao district, in Chiang Mai province, northern Thailand. In 2005 it had a population of 4,244 people.

History & presently
Mueang Khong is a tiny community in the surrounding of the Chiang Dao range. Its name meaning "city or town of Khong", since it has the Khong and Mae Taeng rivers flowing through the area. For Khong is a river that originated from neighbouring Wiang Haeng district, and flows confluence with the Mae Taeng river at the end of the sub-district.

In the past, it was only a pass or overnight spot for people who traveled from somewhere else.

Nowadays, this community is well-known as another tourist attraction in the district. There are homestays, coffee shops, and paddy fields that are check-in and good photography spots for visitors. It has interestingly adapted itself for tourism.

Geography
Mueang Khong is 30 km (18 mi) from downtown Chiang Dao. It can be accessible via a steep hilly route as well as off-road route connecting to Huai Nam Dang, Wiang Kaen, and Mae Taeng districts.

The terrain is a plain that is surrounded by Chiang Dao range, with a total area of 270 km2 (100 sq mi), mostly paddy fields.

Neighbouring districts are (from north clockwise): Wiang Haeng of Chiang Mai, Mueang Ngai in its district, Mae Taeng of Chiang Mai, and Pai of Mae Hong Son.

Demography
Ethnic groups consist of Lanna people, Tai Yai, Lisu,  Lahu, and Paganyaw Christian.

Economy
Mueang Khong has grown its own rice, which is why there are extensive paddy field for admiring during both the cropping and harvesting seasons.

Weaving baskets (Kuai in dialect) is an additional occupation of the locals when they are free from cultivation.

Administration
The tambon is divided into six administrative mubans (villages)

Local food
Pla Klom Mon or just called Pla Mon (Scaphiodonichthys acanthopterus) are small freshwater fish in barb family that are plentiful in the Khong river. This species of fish is deep fried with garlic, and it will so crispy that can eat all of it, considered as a local food that is unique to this community.

References

Tambon of Chiang Mai province
Populated places in Chiang Mai province
Tourist attractions in Chiang Mai province